Neville Vincent Gorton (1 March 1888 – 30 November 1955) was the 4th bishop of the restored see of Coventry  in the modern era.

Gorton was born on 1 March 1888, the son of Anglican Rev. Canon C. V. Gorton, and educated at Marlborough College and Balliol College, Oxford, where he was an exhibitioner and Aubrey Moore student. Gorton was a career school-master who after taking holy orders spent 20 years at Sedbergh School, during which time he married Ethel Ingledew Daggett, with whom he had two sons (including the production designer Assheton Gorton) and one daughter  rising to the rank of housemaster. He was then appointed head of Blundell's School where he was to remain until the call to face the challenges of a severely bombed diocese.

A passionate advocate of Christian Unity Gorton's vision was for a “People’s cathedral”. Gorton himself was a curious mixture of conventional (he passionately opposed the remarriage of divorced people in church) and lateral thinker – his wide experience with boys gave him a very realistic view of “sin”. A master of the short, pithy sermon, he was a much admired churchman. He died in office on 30 November 1955 aged 67.

Notes

1888 births
1955 deaths
Alumni of Balliol College, Oxford
Bishops of Coventry
People educated at Marlborough College
20th-century Church of England bishops
Heads of Blundell's School